These are the RPM magazine Dance number one hits of 1996.

Chart history

See also
List of RPM number-one dance singles chart (Canada)

References

 
Canada Dance
Dance 1996
RPM dance singles 1996
Dance singles 1996